Filinia is a genus of rotifers belonging to the family Trochosphaeridae.

The genus was first described by Jean Baptiste Bory de Saint-Vincent in 1824.

The genus has cosmopolitan distribution.

Species:
 Filinia brachiata (Rousselet, 1901)
 Filinia camasecla Myers, 1938
 Filinia cornuta (Weisse, 1847)
 Filinia limnetica (Zacharias, 1893)
 Filinia longiseta (Ehrenberg, 1834)
 Filinia novaezealandiae Shiel & Sanoamuang, 1993
 Filinia opoliensis (Zacharias, 1898)
 Filinia passa (O.F. Muller, 1786)
 Filinia pejleri Hutchinson, 1964
 Filinia terminalis (Plate, 1886)

References

Flosculariaceae